, also known as Sakonshōgen (左近将監), was a samurai retainer and military commander of Oda Nobunaga, and later Toyotomi Hideyoshi, during Japan's Sengoku period. His biological son, Toshimasu, was adopted by Toshihisa and later Kazumasu served Nobunaga alongside Toshimasu's adopted uncle, Maeda Toshiie.

Military Life
An account cited that Kazumasu served as an envoy for Nobunaga. He was, for instance, sent to Akagawa Motoyasu in the latter's effort of consolidating his power in 1561.

Kazumasu served in the vanguard of the Oda army for two invasions of Ise Province in 1567 and 1568 that crushed numerous families of Ise. Later, Nobunaga send Kazumasu on a campaigns against the Ikkō-ikki of Sieges of Nagashima  (1571–1574).

In 1572, Kazumasu along with Sakuma Nobumori was sent by Oda Nobunaga to provide reinforcement to Tokugawa Ieyasu when he was attacked by Takeda Shingen at Battle of Mikatagahara.

Under Nobunaga, he took part in a great many battles, including the  Siege of Ichijodani Castle (1573), the Battle of Nagashino (1575) served as the commander-in-chief of the infantry units. After Nagashino, he participated in the Battle of Tennoji (1576). Later, Nobunaga order him to Conquest Kii province, also  aided in the Battle of Tedorigawa (1577).

In 1578, at the Second Battle of Kizugawaguchi, Kazumasu commanded a white ship to accompany the six black ships commanded by Kuki Yoshitaka against Mori navy.

In 1579-1581, he fought in the Tenshō Iga War in Iga Province. Kazumasu's achievements include the capture of Seki castle. 

In 1582, Kazumasu along with Kawajiri Hidetaka became military commander against Takeda clan last remnants. Later, Takigawa was appointed Kantō-kanrei (Shōgun's Deputy in the East) by Nobunaga; in this post, with a portion of Kōzuke Province as his domain, he was assigned to keep an eye on the powerful Hōjō clan, based at Odawara.

Following Nobunaga's death in 1582, Takigawa defended Oda territory, but lost in the Battle of Kanagawa (1582) against Hojo clan and back to Ise Province.

In 1583, he and Shibata Katsuie along with many of the Oda retainers, initially opposed Toyotomi Hideyoshi, but he was defeated defending Kameyama Castle (Mie), after Hideyoshi used mines to bring down the castle.

Death
After Kazumasu submitted to Hideyoshi and assisted during the Komaki Campaign (1584) by attacking Kanie castle along with Kuki Yoshitaka. When he performed badly for killing his cousin, Maeda Tanetoshi, in this campaign, he shaved his head, become a Buddhist monk and retired from battle in shame. He is thought to have died in Echizen around 1586.

Takigawa's standard was three red circles arranged vertically.

References

 Frederic, Louis (2002). Japan Encyclopedia, Cambridge, Massachusetts: Harvard University Press.
 Sansom, George (1961). A History of Japan: 1334–1615, Stanford, California: Stanford University Press.

1525 births
1586 deaths
Daimyo
Oda retainers